Hasanabad (also Romanized as Ḩasanābād) is a village in Shurakat-e Jonubi Rural District, Ilkhchi District, Osku County, East Azerbaijan Province, Iran. At the 2006 census, its population was 105, in 29 families.

References 

Populated places in Osku County